Piz Dado is a mountain peak of the Glarus Alps, situated above Breil/Brigels in the canton of Graubünden. It is the most eastern peak of the Brigelser Hörner just next to Piz Dadens (2772 m).

References

External links
 Piz Dado on Hikr

Mountains of Graubünden
Mountains of the Alps
Mountains of Switzerland
Breil/Brigels